Saccopharynx berteli is a species of ray-finned fish within the family Saccopharyngidae. It is known from a single holotype collected from the central Pacific Ocean through an open fishing net at a depth of 1100 meters in 1977. The individual caught was an immature male with a length of 89.5 centimeters. It has been classified as a 'Data deficient' species by the IUCN Red List as there is little information regarding its population, ecology, distribution, and potential threats.

References 

Fish described in 2000
IUCN Red List data deficient species
Saccopharyngidae
Taxa named by Jørgen G. Nielsen
Deep sea fish
Fish of the Pacific Ocean